Calonotos plumulatus is a moth of the subfamily Arctiinae. It was described by Edward A. Klages in 1906. It is found in Venezuela.

References

External links
Original description: Proceedings of the United States National Museum: 541.

Arctiinae
Moths described in 1906